Zakiya Dara Randall (born May 12, 1991) is an American golfer, public speaker, model and music producer, known as 'Z'. Born in Arlington, Virginia, she was raised at an early age in the Washington, D.C. metropolitan area and later as a child moved to Atlanta, Georgia.

Early life
Randall was born in Arlington, Virginia, the only child of Donnie Randall, an engineer, and Tanya Randall an information technology consultant. Randall's father is African-American and her mother is of African-American, Native American and Irish descent. By the age of two, Randall could read. She was awarded "Valedictorian" of her class at the age of five. Randall's interest in sports and music started at an early age. She has been trained in classical piano. By the age of 9, Randall had won the Atlanta Lawn Tennis Association (ALTA) championship event.

Her interest in golf began unexpectedly after joining a family friend on the golf course. In her first year of playing golf she won every tournament she entered and won the Atlanta Junior Golf Association (AJGA) Championship going on to receive "Player of the Year" honors. At 14, Randall started gaining national and international attention for winning 35 of 36 junior golf tournaments.

Career
Randall began receiving national and international attention only four years after beginning golf at age 14. She was awarded and crowned champion and 'Player of the Year' honors in her first year of playing golf in 2002. In 2006, she became the only Atlantan to win a medal and first place in U.S. Women's Open local qualifier. Randall at age 17, became the first female in Georgia to win at the Championship level against an all amateur men field of players on the Golf Channel Tour.

In 2012, Randall was a contestant on the Golf Channel's Big Break Atlantis.

References

American female golfers
1991 births
Living people
21st-century American women